Abramovo is a rural locality (a village) in Gankovskoye Rural Settlement of Tikhvinsky District, Leningrad Oblast, Russia. The population was 6 as of 2017.

Geography 
Abramovo is located 60 km northeast of Tikhvin (the district's administrative centre) by road. Terenino is the nearest rural locality.

References 

Rural localities in Leningrad Oblast
Tikhvinsky District
Tikhvinsky Uyezd